Coquitlam Centre is a shopping mall in Coquitlam, British Columbia, Canada, built in 1979 and expanded in 2001. It is located at the southern edge of the Coquitlam Town Centre area, near Coquitlam Central station and several other smaller shopping centres.

Coquitlam Centre is a super-regional sized shopping centre anchored by Walmart, Hudson's Bay, Best Buy, Dollarama, London Drugs and T & T Supermarket. Coquitlam Centre's original anchor tenants included Hudson's Bay, Eaton's, and Woodward's.

Transportation
Coquitlam Centre's location was chosen because it is at the intersection of Lougheed Highway and Barnet Highway, two major regional thoroughfares which provide access to Highway 1. The mall is located across Barnet Highway from Coquitlam Central stationa major transportation hub for the area with a public bus interchange, West Coast Express commuter rail station, and a SkyTrain station.

On July 19, 2012, the federal government, the City of Coquitlam, and Coquitlam Centre finalized a deal that added Lincoln station to the route of the SkyTrain's Evergreen extension. Lincoln station is located next to the mall across Pinetree Way.

Film and television
The interior of the mall has been featured in several film and television productions, including the Academy Award-winning movie Juno, Ladies and Gentlemen, The Fabulous Stains, The Sisterhood of the Traveling Pants and Grumpy Cat's Worst Christmas Ever.

See also
 List of shopping malls in Canada

References

External links
 
 Bird's Eye view of Coquitlam Centre on Live Search

Buildings and structures in Coquitlam
Shopping malls in Metro Vancouver
Shopping malls established in 1979
1979 establishments in British Columbia